Ghulam Muhammad Mahar Medical College (غلام محمد مہر میڈیکل کالج)  or GMMMC in short is the sixth public sector Medical college under the Government of Sindh where 100 meritorious students of tagged districts, including Sukkur, Khairpur and Ghotki are getting education every year. It is named after Sindh politician Ghulam Muhammad Khan Mahar.

It is a constituent College of Shaheed Mohtarma Benazir Bhutto Medical University, located in the center of Sukkur city GMMMC is home to 500 students in the MBBS programs, with clinical rotations occurring at GMMMC Teaching Hospital, Government Anwar Piracha Teaching Hospital, SIUT Chablani Medical Center Sukkur, National Institute of Cardiovascular Diseases (NICVD), Sukkur satellite center.  The school has a large and experienced faculty to support its mission of education, research, and clinical care. Faculty members hold appointments at basic sciences and clinical departments. There are about 114 full-time faculty members  consisting of Lecturers, Assistant Professors, Associate Professors, and Professors at GMMMC.

History 

Presently Sukkur is the medium-sized city with a population of over half a million, sending its children to about twenty five high schools and at least one dozen colleges. 
With such a history, Geographical Importance and a large number of growing youth, city rightly deserved a Medical college to take care of the Medical Education and tertiary health care facilities for the people of the area. The demand of the People (particularly the youth) of Sukkur to have a Medical College was not new. In year 2002 the idea and the place of Sukkur as the central point for establishment of a medical college had been gaining grounds in the heart and minds of decision makers and people at large. Finally on 2 September 2003 that dream came true and the sixth Public sector Medical College with the name of Sardar Ghulam Muhammad Khan Mahar Medical College Sukkur was inaugurated by Chief Minister of Sindh Ali Mohammad Mahar in the building of Health Technician School Sukkur. The classes were started for first batch of 40 students on 15 October 2003.  Sardar Ghulam Muhammad Khan Mahar Medical College Sukkur was named after Philanthropist of the area, veteran Politician and Chief (Sardar Urdu: سردار) of Mahar (Sindhi tribe), Late Sardar Ghulam Muhammad Khan Mahar. Later on, the college was renamed on 27 December 2005 by shortening its original name to Ghulam Muhammad Mahar Medical College (GMMMC).

Campus 

Ghulam Muhammad Mahar Medical College Sukkur is established in three beautiful buildings, including the former Directorate of Health Sukkur, the Health Technician School, and the Masoom Shah Hostel of Health Technician School. The medical school building has three spacious lecture halls with the latest audiovisual teaching aids, well-equipped laboratories, museums and library including the learning resource center (LRC) with access to the Digital Library of the Higher Education Commission through Computers.

Keeping in view the extreme climate of the northern Sindh, all the buildings of GMMMC, like the Lecture halls, Dissection hall, Demonstration Rooms, Seminar Rooms, Laboratories, libraries and offices of faculty members are air-conditioned.

Library Block 
Library Building was constructed as separate block in front of Academic Block No. 3. It is a two-story building, the ground floor consists of a final-year lecture hall (lecture Hall No. 4), first-floor reference library, and the second floor has a lending library for students and staff.

Academic Blocks 
There are three academic Blocks in GMMMC.

 Eastern Academic Block No.1 comprises Anatomy, Physiology, Biochemistry Departments and a lecture hall (Lecture hall No.1) 
 Academic Block No. 2 comprises Departments of Pathology and Community Medicine. 
 Academic Block No. 3 comprises Department of Pharmacology, Department of Forensic Medicine, Lecture Hall No. 2 and Lecture Hall No. 3, Girls common room; besides that, Administration Block (having the Principal/ Dean of the College Office along with supporting staff offices, Learning Resource Center (LRC), Academic Council Hall) is also located in this block.

Hospital Block 
Children Emergency Room, Ghulam Muhammad Mahar Medical College Hospital – Sukkur was established on Dec 30, 2019 which is a 40-bedded facility covering area of approx. 6300 sq. feet, providing 24/7 free-of-cost emergency services to the residents of Sukkur and its adjoining areas including Rohri, Panoakil, Khairpur, Saleh Pat and Shikarpur.

ChildLife’s Emergency Room is equipped with Triage facility for assessment and categorization of patients coming to the ER. Phototherapy Units, Cardiac Monitors and Infusion Pumps are available for the patients care.

New Complex

The 53.8 Acres of land was acquired for GMMMC Complex at the Sukkur Bypass, connecting main national highway N-5 National Highway (Karachi - Lahore - Islamabad - Peshawar) with N-65 National Highway (Sukkur - Quetta)  bypassing the congested urban roads in the city of Sukkur. The new Complex will house (In sha Allah)  Buildings for, Medical College, Student Hostels, Residential Quarters for faculty and supporting staff,  and 1200 bedded Teaching hospital. The foundation stone of the Complex was laid by the then Chief Minister of Sindh Arbab Ghulam Rahim on 30th day of May 2005. The private consultancy firm has designed the Master Plan (the detailed drawing) of the Project, and is currently supervising the construction work in the new complex which is in full swing and according to assistant engineer of the college, the construction work of new block will be completed soon.

Hostels Block

The construction work of a Girl's Hostel has been completed and now it is functional. According to assistant engineer of the GMMMC project there were 90 rooms in the girls’ hostel where about 270 students are residing while structure of boys’ hostel had been completed and finishing work is going on which will be completed soon. The girl's hostel has been named as Begum Nusrat Bhutto Female Student's Hostel.

Recognition 
Pakistan Medical & Dental Council Islamabad inspected Ghulam Muhammad Mahar Medical College Sukkur on 25 April 2008 and thoroughly re-inspected it on 22 November 2008. At the best of satisfaction the team recommended GMMMMC for registration. Federal Ministry of Health Government of Pakistan Islamabad has notified it as recognized Medical College. Now GMMMC is fully recognized by the PMDC, Higher Education Commission of Pakistan (HEC), and the World Health Organization (WHO). The College of Physicians and Surgeons of Pakistan has recognized its Teaching Hospitals for post-graduate training leading to FCPS and MCPS degrees in different disciplines of Medicine and surgery.

Departments 

 Basic medical sciences
 Anatomy
 Physiology
 Biochemistry
 Pharmacology
 Forensic Medicine
 Pathology
 Community Medicine
 Medicine and allied
 Internal Medicine
 Pediatrics
 Cardiology
 Neurology
 Psychiatry
 Nephrology
 Dermatology
 Surgery and allied
 General Surgery
 Obstetrics and Gynecology
 Orthopedics
 Ophthalmology
 Otorhinolaryngology (ENT)
 Cardiac Surgery
 Surgery and allied (Cont.)
 Pediatric Surgery
 Anesthesiology
 Urology
 Neurosurgery
 Radiology
 Oncology

Education

Undergraduate 
 A five-year program of Bachelor of Medicine, Bachelor of Surgery (MBBS)

Postgraduate 
 Fellow of College of Physicians and Surgeons Pakistan (FCPS).
 Member of College of Physicians and Surgeons Pakistan (MCPS)

Attached Teaching Hospitals  

 GMMMC Teaching Hospital, Sukkur
 Government Anwar Piracha Teaching Hospital, Sukkur
 SIUT Chablani Medical Center Sukkur
 National Institute of Cardiovascular Diseases (NICVD), Sukkur satellite center

Admission 

A student is eligible to apply after a Higher Secondary School Certificate (HSSC)/ A Level/ any other Equivalent examination. Candidates are selected by a rigorous admission process that includes a competitive centralized Medical College Admission Test (MDCAT) conducted by NTS annually. Merit is determined by the marks obtained on the MDCAT, HSSC/ A Level/ Equivalent examination and SSC/ O Level/ Equivalent examination.

See also
 Ghulam Muhammad Khan Mahar
 Shaheed Mohtarma Benazir Bhutto Medical University

References

External links
 Ghulam Muhammad Mahar Medical College Sukkur The Official website
 Shaheed Mohtarma Benazir Bhutto Medical University The University to which the college is affiliated

Medical colleges in Sindh
Sukkur
Public universities and colleges in Sindh